Paul Winston McCracken (December 29, 1915 – August 3, 2012) was an American economist born in Richland, Iowa.

He held an M.A. and Ph.D. from Harvard University in Economics and a B.A. from William Penn University. He was the Edmund Ezra Day Distinguished University Professor Emeritus of Business Administration, Economics, and Public Policy at the University of Michigan. McCracken was chairman of the President's Council of Economic Advisors from 1969 to 1971 under President Richard Nixon. He took the lead in developing economic policy at the outset of the Nixon administration.

In 1976 he was elected as a Fellow of the American Statistical Association. He chaired the American Enterprise Institute's Council of Academic Advisors and served as interim president of the institute in 1986.

He died on August 3, 2012, at age 96.

References

External links 
 McCracken's faculty profile on the University of Michigan website
 
 

|-

1915 births
2012 deaths
Economists from Iowa
American Enterprise Institute
Harvard Graduate School of Arts and Sciences alumni
Nixon administration personnel
People from Ann Arbor, Michigan
People from Keokuk County, Iowa
University of Michigan faculty
William Penn University alumni
Fellows of the American Statistical Association
Mackinac Center for Public Policy
Economists from Michigan
Michigan Republicans
Chairs of the United States Council of Economic Advisers
Member of the Mont Pelerin Society